The following is a list of Ball State Cardinals men's basketball head coaches. The Cardinals have had 20 coaches in their 102-season history.

Ball State's current head coach is Michael Lewis. He was hired in March 2022 to replace James Whitford, who was fired by Ball State at the end of the 2021–22 season.

References

Ball State

Ball State Cardinals men's basketball coaches